Eucalyptus adesmophloia is a mallee that is endemic to the south-west of Western Australia. Its fresh bark is grey, the leaves are a glossy dark green, the flowers are white and borne in large groups, and the fruits are conical to hemispherical.

Description
It has loose, rough bark that is shed in plates and short strips to reveal smooth grey and cream-coloured new bark. The stamens are white.

Taxonomy and naming
This eucalypt was first formally described in 1993 by Ian Brooker and Stephen Hopper who gave it the name Eucalyptus decipiens subsp. adesmophloia and published the description in the journal Nuytsia. In 2012, Dean Nicolle and Malcolm French raised it to species status as Eucalyptus adesmophloia. The specific epithet (adesmophloia) is derived from Greek, meaning "unfettered bark", referring to the loose, ribbony bark of this species.

Distribution and habitat
Eucalyptus adesmophloia grows in mallee shrubland between the Stirling Range, Bremer Bay, Manypeaks and the Fitzgerald River National Park where it is common.

Conservation
This eucalypt has been classified as "not threatened" by the Western Australian Government Department of Parks and Wildlife.

See also

List of Eucalyptus species

References

Eucalypts of Western Australia
adesmophloia
Myrtales of Australia
Plants described in 1993
Taxa named by Ian Brooker
Taxa named by Stephen Hopper